The Somesvara Siva temple is located in the Kharakhia Baidyanath temple precinct in Kharakhia Vaidyanath Sahi, Old Town, of Bhubaneswar. It is located approximately 300 metres south of Lingaraja temple. Visitors may approach the site on the left side of Baidyanath Road leading from Lingaraja temple to Kapilesvar. It is a living temple and faces towards the west. The enshrined deity of this temple is a Siva lingam within a circular yonipitha at the center of the sanctuary located 0.93 metres below the chandrasila. The temple is under the care and maintenance of Babulal Makaddam Badu Mohapatra, the chief priest of the temple, on whose private land the temple stands.

Ownership

Single/ Multiple
Single.

Public/ Private
Private.

Name
Babulal Makaddam Badu Mohapatra

Address
Kharakhia Baidyanath Sahi, Old Town, Bhubaneswar

Age

Approximate date
10th/11th century A.D.

Source of Information
Architectural features like trianga bada and fourfold pabhaga
mouldings, kani being absent.

Property Type

Precinct/ Building/ Structure/Landscape/Site/Tank
Precinct

Subtype
Temple.

Typology
Vimana is in rekha deul whereas jagamohana is of pidha
deul.

Property use

Abandoned/ in use
In use.

Present use
Living temple.

Past use
Worshipped.

Significance

Cultural significance
Rituals like Sivaratri, Sankranti and Mahavishuva-
Sankranti are celebrated.

Physical description

Surrounding
Within the precinct the temple is surrounded by
Markandesvara temple in the east at a distance of 1.60 metres, Nilakantha Siva temple in north
within a distance of 15 metres and the compound wall in the western and southern sides.

Orientation
The temple is facing towards west.

Architectural features (Plan & Elevation)
On plan, the temple has a vimana and a
jagamohana. The vimana is pancharatha having a central raha distinguished by pairs of
253
anuratha and kanika paga on either side of the raha. The vimana measures 4.40 square
metres and jagamohana measures 6.20 square metres. On elevation, the vimana is of rekha
order and jagamohana is in pidha order as usual in Orissan temples, having bada, gandi
and mastaka. With threefold division of the bada of the vimana has a trianga bada measuring
3.18 metres in height. At the bottom, the pabhaga has four base mouldings of khura, kumbha,
pata and basanta that measures 0.84 metres in height, Jangha measures 1.57 metres in height
and baranda measuring 0.77 metres with a thick of has three mouldings. The gandi and mastaka
measures 4.00 metres and 2.00 metres in height respectively. The bada of Jagamohana measures
2.30 metres having trianga bada. Pabhaga, jangha and baranda measures 0.71 metres, 1.09
metres, and 0.50 metres in height respectively. The gandi and mastaka of the jagamohana
measures 2.50 metres and 1.20 metres.

Raha niche and parsva devatas
Parsvadevata niches located on the raha paga of the jangha on the three sides of north,
south and east measuring 0.94 metres in height, 0.66 metres in width and 0.31 metres in depth are
empty except the northern niche that enshrines a beautiful standing image of Parvati with
broken hands.

Decorative features
Beneath the raha niche has tala garbhika decoration and in the western rahapaga there is a gajakranta at the center of the gandi. Besides this the bada and gandi of the temple are devoid of decorations.  Doorjamb: The doorjambs of vimana and
jagamohana are decorated with three plain
vertical bands. That measures 1.83 metres in height
and 1.32 metres in width. At the base of the
doorjambs, there are a dvarapala niches
surmounted by chaitya motifs. The niches
measuring 0.36 metres in height, 0.18 metres in width
and a depth of 0.07 metres houses Saivite
dvarapalas holding tridents in their right hands
and their left hand is in varada mudra.

Lintel
In the lalatabimba, Gajalaxmi is seated
in lalitasana over a lotus pedestal. The deity is
holding lotus in her left hand and her right hand
is in varadamudra. The architrave above the
doorjamb is carved with the navagrahas but due
to the renovation work the grahas like Ravi,
Rahu and Ketu are concealed.

Building material
The temple is
made of laterite stone.

Construction techniques
Dry masonry.

Style
Kalingan.

Special features, if any
Though the Yonipitha is usually circular here it is square,
made of laterite.

State of preservation

Good/Fair/ Showing Signs of Deterioration/Advanced
Good because of the
renovation work done by the Orissa State Archaeology under X and XI Finance Commission
Award.

Condition description

Signs of distress
Growth of vegetation.

Repairs and Maintenance
The owner of the temple clears the surrounding vegetation
after the rainy season.

Grade (A/B/C)
i) Architecture: B
ii) Historic: C
iii) Associational: C
iv) Social/Cultural: B
v) Others: —

Well
There is a well in the center of the Kharakhia Baidyanath
temple precinct, it is made of laterite blocks and it is located at a distance of 9.40 metres north
of the temple.

Threats to the property

Conservation Problem and Remedies
Growth of Vegetation: Creepers in the beki of jagamohana and a pipal tree on the amlaka
stone. The whole temple is covered with lichens.
There is a compound wall made of laterite blocks measuring 53 square metres and 2.25 metres
in height with the thickness of 0.84 metres.
Detached and loose sculptures: In the northern side of the vimana, there is an image of
Siva.

References 

 Dr. Sadasiba Pradhan & Team, dated on 15 November 2006, Debala Mitra, ‘Bhubaneswar’ New Delhi, 1958, p. 29.
 K.C. Panigrahi, Archaeological Remains at Bhubaneswar, Calcutta, 1961. PP. 16–17 and 25.
 L. S.S. O’ Malley, Bengal District Gazetteer Puri, Calcutta 1908, P. 240.
 M.M. Ganguly, Orissa and Her remains, Calcutta, 1912, PP. 393–394.
 P.R. Ramachandra Rao, Bhubaneswar Kalinga Temple Architecture, Hyderabad, 1980, P. 29.
 R.P. Mohapatra, ‘Archaeology in Orissa’. Vol. I, Delhi, 1986. P. 57.
 R.L. Mitra. The Antiauities of Orissa, Vol.II, Calcutta, 1963, PP. 160–161.
 T.E. Donaldson, ‘Hindu Temple Art of Orissa’. Vol. I, Leiden, 1985, P. 76.

External links 
 

Shiva temples in Odisha
Hindu temples in Bhubaneswar